Dejan Osmanović (born 29 January 1973) is a Serbian former footballer of Romani descent.

One of the most prolific strikers in FR Yugoslavia during the late 1990s and early 2000s, Osmanović is the third-highest scorer in the top flight of his country (including Serbia and its predecessors) with 101 goals (behind only Saša Ilić and Nenad Mirosavljević). He is best remembered for his time at Hajduk Kula, becoming the club's all-time top scorer.

Club career
After starting at his hometown club Dinamo Vranje, Osmanović was transferred to Hajduk Kula in the summer of 1996. He helped the side to a fourth-place finish in his debut season, as they qualified for the 1997 UEFA Intertoto Cup. With 16 goals, Osmanović would become the First League of FR Yugoslavia top scorer in the NATO bombing-suspended 1998–99 season.

In August 1999, after scoring in Hajduk's opening round of the new campaign, Osmanović moved abroad to Spain and signed with Segunda División club Extremadura. He, however, failed to make an impact with the team, appearing in just four league matches, before leaving in December. Upon his return to Kula, Osmanović scored 25 times in 24 fixtures (1.04 goals per game) during the 2000–01 season, but finished second in the league behind Petar Divić with 27 goals.

In July 2001, Osmanović moved abroad for the second time to play for Brazilian club Vitória. He scored two goals until the end of the year. In early 2002, Osmanović was loaned to his former club Hajduk Kula until the end of the season, before returning to Brazil.

In December 2002, it was reported that Osmanović would be rejoining Hajduk Kula for the third time. He scored five goals in 22 appearances during the 2003–04 season. In the summer of 2004, Osmanović was loaned to Second League club Budućnost Banatski Dvor ahead of their UEFA Cup campaign.

In August 2007, shortly after leaving Bežanija, Osmanović was signed by fellow Serbian SuperLiga side Smederevo. He scored his 100th goal in the top flight while playing for Banat Zrenjanin in 2008. In February 2009, Osmanović returned to his parent club Dinamo Vranje.

International career
In January 2001, Osmanović represented FR Yugoslavia at the Millennium Super Soccer Cup, as the team won the tournament. He made three (non-official) appearances in the process.

Career statistics

Honours
 First League of FR Yugoslavia Top Scorer: 1998–99

References

External links
 
 
 
 

Association football forwards
Campeonato Brasileiro Série A players
CF Extremadura footballers
Esporte Clube Vitória players
Expatriate footballers in Brazil
Expatriate footballers in Spain
First League of Serbia and Montenegro players
FK Banat Zrenjanin players
FK Bežanija players
FK Budućnost Banatski Dvor players
FK Dinamo Vranje players
FK Hajduk Kula players
FK Smederevo players
People from Vranje
Romani footballers
Segunda División players
Serbia and Montenegro expatriate footballers
Serbia and Montenegro expatriate sportspeople in Brazil
Serbia and Montenegro expatriate sportspeople in Spain
Serbia and Montenegro footballers
Serbian First League players
Serbian footballers
Serbian Romani people
Serbian SuperLiga players
1973 births
Living people